From January 2012 to June 2018, Airwars and the New America Foundation have identified 2,180 declared and alleged airstrikes by up to eight domestic and foreign belligerents, operating within Libya. While majority of the airstrikes are conducted by US and Libyan National Army, occasionally other countries like France, Egypt and UAE have also conducted airstrikes. Hundreds of civilians have been reportedly killed in these strikes. Public sources estimate 244-379 civilian deaths in Libya.

Airstrikes

Libyan National Army (LNA) 
 1365 reported strikes
 110–173 alleged civilian fatalities.

United States
527 Reported Strikes
11–21 alleged civilian fatalities

Libyan Government of National Accord 
90 reported strikes
7–9 alleged civilian fatalities

Libyan General National Congress 
47 Reported Strikes
7–8 alleged civilian fatalities

United Arab Emirates
50 Reported Strikes
11–18 alleged civilian fatalities

Egypt 
41 Reported Strikes
13–14 alleged civilian fatalities

France 
5 Reported Strikes
4–8 alleged civilian fatalities

Joint/Contested
237 Reported Strikes
94–139 alleged civilian fatalities

Unknown
209 Reported Strikes
16–24 alleged civilian fatalities

See also
List of drone strikes in Yemen
American airstrikes in Somalia
List of drone strikes in Pakistan
List of drone strikes in Afghanistan

References

Libyan war casualties